Tiny Toon Adventures is a platform video game for the NES. It was developed and published by Konami and released in 1991. It is the first Tiny Toon Adventures video game to be released for a video game console.

Gameplay

The player initially controls Buster Bunny in the effort to rescue Babs Bunny from her kidnapper, Montana Max (aka Monty). Before each world, the player can select an alternate character that they can switch into if they find a star ball. The three alternate characters are Dizzy Devil, Furrball, and Plucky Duck. Dizzy, Furrball, and Plucky have unique abilities that Buster lacks: Plucky can briefly fly, Dizzy can destroy walls and most enemies with his spin mode, and Furrball can climb many vertical surfaces, slowly sliding down them rather than plunging down. However, Buster can jump higher than others.

There are six worlds in the game, with three levels each: The Hills, The Wetlands, The Trees, Downtown, Wackyland (unlike the rest, this world only has one level), and Monty's Mansion. Aiding Buster is Hamton, who will give Buster an extra lives for 30 carrots each. The second level in each world concludes with an enclosed area where the player must avoid Elmyra and exit through the door; if the player is grabbed by Elmyra, they must start the world over. The third level in each world concludes with a boss battle.

Duck Vader (a parody of Darth Vader) makes a cameo appearance as a secret boss if the number of carrots collected in any level is odd multiple of eleven. If the player can defeat him without losing one life in the process, three extra lives will be gained.

Reception

Nintendo Power had placed the game at 19th for March 1993 of their magazine regarding Top 20 NES games at that point.

References

External links

1991 video games
Konami games
Nintendo Entertainment System games
Nintendo Entertainment System-only games
Platform games
Single-player video games
Video games based on Tiny Toon Adventures
Video games developed in Japan